Swindler is a surname. Notable people with the name include:

Daris Swindler (1925–2007), American anthropologist
John Edward Swindler (1944–1990), American murderer
Mary Hamilton Swindler (1884–1967), American archaeologist, author, and professor

See also
Swindle (surname)

Surnames from nicknames